Yang Xiaoyan (born 3 March 1980) is a Chinese sailor who competed in the 2000 Summer Olympics.

References

1980 births
Living people
Olympic sailors of China
Chinese female sailors (sport)
Sailors at the 2000 Summer Olympics – 470
Asian Games medalists in sailing
Sailors at the 1998 Asian Games
Medalists at the 1998 Asian Games
Asian Games gold medalists for China
21st-century Chinese women